The Commissioner for Neighbourhood and Enlargement is the member of the European Commission in charge of overseeing the accession process of prospective new member states and relations with those bordering the European Union (EU). The present Commissioner, as of December 2019, is Olivér Várhelyi.

Currently there are eight candidate countries, namely Albania, Bosnia and Herzegovina,  Moldova, Montenegro, North Macedonia, Serbia, Turkey, and Ukraine. Two countries are recognised as potential candidates, namely Georgia and Kosovo. Candidate status was most recently granted to Bosnia and Herzegovina in December 2022, and a so-called "European Perspective" recognising a country as a potential candidate to Georgia in June 2022.  Neighbourhood Policy is directed towards the Western Balkans, those countries on the EU's eastern borders, often referred to as the Eastern Partnership or the accession trio, and on the coast of the Mediterranean Sea, referred to as the Southern Neighbourhood and often engaged with in the format of the Union for the Mediterranean.

Rehn
Olli Rehn became enlargement commissioner in 2004, following the enlargement to 10 new countries. In 2007 he oversaw the accession of Romania and Bulgaria to the Union. In 2004, candidate status was granted to Croatia. In 2005, candidate status was granted to Macedonia.

As Commissioner, Rehn has been involved with the enlargement to the western Balkans and Turkey, encouraging reform on those countries. 2006 saw the independence of Montenegro and separate accession talks starting with them.

In 2007 he welcomed the UN proposal on Kosovo by Martti Ahtisaari which advocated near-independence to the region and would have seen separate accession negotiations with the Union.

The Commissioner has also been involved in the reunification of Cyprus, bringing Northern Cyprus into the European Union. Rehn's head of cabinet was Timo Pesonen and his deputy head was Maria Åsenius.

Füle

Croatia acceded to the Union in 2013.

List of commissioners
The enlargement portfolio began to be created out of the regionalised foreign policy posts. In particular the Santer Commission post for relations with central and eastern Europe as those countries began applying to join. The Neighbourhood Policy element was created in 2004 as part of the External Relations portfolio. When that portfolio was absorbed by the High Representative in 2009, Neighbourhood Policy was transferred to Trade and then to Enlargement in 2010 under the Second Barroso Commission.

See also
Directorate-General for Neighbourhood and Enlargement Negotiations
Enlargement of the European Union
Foreign relations of the European Union
European Union Association Agreement
Deep and Comprehensive Free Trade Area

External links
 Commissioner Commissioners website 
 Enlargement website 
 Rehn warns of 'chaos' in Kosovo if UN plan fails

References

Enlargement
Commissioner